Good Deal is  the third album by jazz group The Three Sounds featuring performances recorded in 1959 and released on the Blue Note label. Like the majority of the band's albums, it has been released on CD only in Japan, as a limited edition.

Reception

The Allmusic review by Stephen Thomas Erlewine stated: "Good Deal is a typically fine record from the Three Sounds, who were beginning to hit their stride when this session was recorded in May 1959. Like most of their records, it's laidback — even when the group works a swinging tempo, there's a sense of ease that keeps the mood friendly, relaxed and mellow".

Track listing
All compositions by Gene Harris, except as indicated
 "Robbins Nest" - 6:15 (Illinois Jacquet, Charles Thompson)
 "Don't Blame Me" (Fields, McHugh) - 5:16
 "St. Thomas" (Sonny Rollins) - 4:23
 "Down the Track" - 5:27
 "Tracy's Blues" - 3:38
 "That's All" (Alan Brandt, Haymes) - 6:00
 "Satin Doll" (Ellington, Mercer, Strayhorn) - 5:55
 "Soft Winds" (Henderson, Frank Royal) - 4:58

Personnel
Gene Harris - piano
Andrew Simpkins - bass
Bill Dowdy - drums

References

Blue Note Records albums
The Three Sounds albums
1960 albums
Albums recorded at Van Gelder Studio